Nantey is a former commune in the Jura department in Bourgogne-Franche-Comté in eastern France. On 1 January 2016, it was merged into the commune of Val-d'Épy.

Population

See also 
 Communes of the Jura department

References 

Former communes of Jura (department)